Elián Herrera is a Venezuelan model, beauty pageant titleholder and volleyball player. She represented Aragua state at Miss Venezuela 2012.

On August 30, 2012, during the Miss Venezuela 2012 pageant, Elián finished as first runner-up and was crowned Miss Venezuela International 2012. She represented Venezuela in Miss International 2013 but failed to place in the semifinals yet she got the third place at the Miss Internet on line poll.

Elián is an avid sportswoman, she was part of the Venezuela National Female Volleyball team. She represented Venezuela during the Juegos Suramericanos Juveniles in 2009. Before the pageant, she was playing  for the Aragua volleyball team in the Venezuelan league. She helped her team win the national championships in 2010 and 2011.

See also
 Miss Venezuela 2012
 Miss International 2013

References

External links
Miss Venezuela profile

1991 births
Living people
Miss Venezuela International winners
Miss International 2013 delegates